Johnny Concho is a 1956 American Western film directed by Don McGuire starring Frank Sinatra, Keenan Wynn, William Conrad and Phyllis Kirk. This was Sinatra's first serious Western and the role allowed him to play against type in his portrayal of a person of low repute. The film was unsuccessful for Sinatra, ending a string of 8 hit films (5 in the past 13 months) going back to 1953's From Here to Eternity.

Plot
The mean and boastful Johnny Concho is also a coward, but the people of Cripple Creek, Arizona, let him have his way. They know that Johnny's brother, who doesn't live in town, is the notorious gunfighter Red Concho, someone they truly fear.

Mary Dark, daughter of the general store's owner, is in love with Johnny, but isn't yet aware of the kind of man he really is.

Johnny has everyone so cowed that, in a card game, he needn't even show his hand to claim the pot. That lasts until the day a man named Tallman comes to town. Tallman calls the bluff of Johnny at the poker table. Johnny wants the sheriff, Henderson, to take care of this, but Tallman stuns everyone by announcing that he recently stood up to Red Concho in another town and killed him.

Exposed for the yellow-belly he is, Johnny rides off. Mary still loves him and follows, but wherever Johnny goes, word reaches that he is not a man to be trusted or feared. Tallman, meanwhile, has taken over Johnny's role in Cripple Creek, appointing himself as the law and demanding to be paid a percentage from every business in town.

Mary still wants to marry Johnny, but at the wedding his cowardice comes out once more. A man who knew his brother informs him that Red was actually just like Johnny, a blowhard with no guts.

Johnny pulls himself together and returns to Cripple Creek to face Tallman in the street. Tallman wounds him, but the townspeople are impressed by Johnny's bravery and willing to help. Mary's father shoots Tallman and kills him. Johnny prepares to leave town, knowing he's not wanted here, but Mary and the others invite him to stay.

Cast

 Frank Sinatra as Johnny Concho / Johnny Collins
 Keenan Wynn as Barney Clark
 William Conrad as Tallman
 Phyllis Kirk as Mary Dark
 Wallace Ford as Albert Dark
 Dorothy Adams as Sarah Dark
 Christopher Dark as Walker
 Howard Petrie as Joe Helguson, Blacksmith
 Harry Bartell as Sam Green 
 Dan Riss as Judge Earl Tyler
 Willis Bouchey as Sheriff Henderson
 Robert Osterloh as Duke Lang
 Jean Byron as Pearl Lang
 Leo Gordon as Mason 
 Claude Akins as Lem 
 John Qualen as Jake
 Budd Knapp as Pearson (as Wilfred Knapp)
 Ben Wright as Benson
 Joe Bassett as Harry, Bartender
 Strother Martin as Townsman

References

External links 

1956 films
1956 Western (genre) films
American Western (genre) films
Films produced by Frank Sinatra
Films scored by Nelson Riddle
United Artists films
1950s English-language films
1950s American films
American black-and-white films